Pamela Norris is an American screenwriter and producer. She is best known for her work on the NBC sketch comedy series Saturday Night Live (1980–1984), and for co-writing the screenplay of the 1989 film Troop Beverly Hills. She was executive producer of the sitcom Designing Women., and The Huntress on USA Network. She was a Jeopardy! champion in December 1985, winning three games.

Producer
Designing Women (executive producer) 1991–1992
Hearts Afire (co-executive producer) 1994–1995
Mad About You (consulting producer) 1995–1996
The Simple Life (executive producer) 1998
The Huntress (executive producer) 2000–2001
Emeril (consulting producer) 2000–2001

Writer
Saturday Night Live (TV series) 1980–1984
It's Your Move (TV series) 1984–1985
Remington Steele (TV series) 1985
Misfits of Science (TV series) 1985
Wayside School (TV short) 1986
Gimme a Break! (TV series) 1985–1986
The Ellen Burstyn Show (TV series) 1986
Miami Vice (TV series) 1987
Troop Beverly Hills (screenplay) 1989
Designing Women (TV series) 1989-1991
Hearts Afire (TV series) 1995
The Simple Life (TV series) 1998
Rude Awakening (TV series) 1998
The Huntress (TV series) 2000–2001
Emeril (TV series) 2001
The Designing Women Reunion (TV documentary) 2003
Ghost Whisperer (TV series) 2010

References

External links

Year of birth missing (living people)
Living people
American producers
American women screenwriters
Harvard College alumni
Jeopardy! contestants
21st-century American women